NGC 4546 is a lenticular field galaxy located in the direction of the constellation Virgo, with a total population of globular clusters estimated at about 390. It is a member of the Virgo II Groups, a series of galaxies and galaxy clusters strung out from the southern edge of the Virgo Supercluster.

Located 45.6 million light years away, with a stellar mass of about 27 billion solar masses, it has a declination of -03° 47' 35" and an average rise of 12 hours, 35 minutes and 29.5 seconds. NGC 4546 was discovered on December 29, 1786 by William Herschel.

The galaxy appears to be home to a supermassive black hole with a mass of 256 million (± 16 million) times the mass of the Sun. It is estimated to have 390±60 globular clusters.

NGC 4546  appears to have at least 2 companions, NGC 4546-UCD1 and CGCG 014-074.

References

External links 

Lenticular galaxies
Virgo (constellation)
4546
41939
Astronomical objects discovered in 1786
Discoveries by William Herschel